Benjamin Permejo Tolentino Jr. (born September 13, 1973) is a Filipino rower who competed in the 2000 Summer Olympics.

Tolentino has competed for the Philippines in international competitions as early as 1995. He has competed in the Asian Games since the 1998 edition. On December 2017, he has expressed his intention to retire from the sport as a competitor and his plans to become a rowing coach.

He is also a sergeant of the Philippine Air Force.

References

1973 births
Filipino male rowers
Olympic rowers of the Philippines
Philippine Air Force personnel
Rowers at the 2000 Summer Olympics
Rowers at the 1998 Asian Games
Rowers at the 2002 Asian Games
Rowers at the 2006 Asian Games
Rowers at the 2010 Asian Games
Rowers at the 2014 Asian Games
Living people
Southeast Asian Games gold medalists for the Philippines
Southeast Asian Games silver medalists for the Philippines
Southeast Asian Games bronze medalists for the Philippines
Southeast Asian Games medalists in rowing
Competitors at the 2005 Southeast Asian Games
Competitors at the 2007 Southeast Asian Games
Competitors at the 2011 Southeast Asian Games
Competitors at the 2013 Southeast Asian Games
Competitors at the 2015 Southeast Asian Games
Asian Games competitors for the Philippines